Al Dente is a 1998 computer-animated short film created by Aardman Animations.

Plot
A grumpy waiter has to serve a vegetarian meal at a steak restaurant.

Production
James Pursey did the sound, and Fred Reed was the lighting technician.

Cast
 Mike Cooper - Waiter / cook (voice)

Critical reception
Dr. Grob gave the film one star out of five, saying the film appears more primitive than Aardman's previous computer animation short film, Owzat, and that the film "doesn’t feature any backgrounds of notice, and the main character, a grumpy waiter who has to serve a vegetarian meal at a meat restaurant, looks primitive and unimaginative. The film is utterly mediocre and, like Owzat, probably would never have been released were it not an Aardman production."

References

External links 
 

British short films
Animated films without speech
1998 short films
1990s animated short films
1998 computer-animated films
Films set in restaurants
Aardman Animations short films